Clay Township is a township in Hardin County, Iowa, USA.

History
Clay Township was organized in 1855.

References

Townships in Hardin County, Iowa
Townships in Iowa
1855 establishments in Iowa